The Royal College of Organists (RCO) is a charity and membership organisation based in the United Kingdom, with members worldwide. Its role is to promote and advance organ playing and choral music, and it offers music education, training and development, and professional support for organists and choral directors.

The college also provides accreditation in organ playing, choral directing and organ teaching; it runs an extensive education and outreach programme across the UK; and it maintains an internationally important library containing more than 60,000 titles concerning the organ, organ and choral music and organ playing.

History
The RCO was founded as the College of Organists in 1864 by Richard Limpus, the organist of St Michael, Cornhill in the City of London, and received its Royal Charter in 1893. In 1903 it was offered a 99-year lease at peppercorn rent on a building designed by the architect H. H. Cole in Kensington Gore, west London. When it became clear in the mid 1980s that an economic rent would be charged on expiry of that lease, the lease was sold and the college moved into new accommodation in 1991. The building subsequently become the home of property tycoon Robert Tchenguiz.

In 2003 plans were announced for more permanent purpose-built premises around the Grade I listed former Curzon Street railway station in Birmingham, a notable piece of monumental railway architecture. New facilities designed by Associated Architects included a new library and 270-seat concert hall. However, in 2005 the RCO announced that this move would not be taking place and subsequently that it would no longer be looking for a permanent home of this kind, focussing instead on activities such as education, events, examinations and member services.

In 2014 the college celebrated its 150th anniversary with a year-long programme of events including recitals, conferences, music festivals, courses and publications. In 2020 the RCO announced that Saturday 18 April would be its inaugural National Organ Day.

First members
The first members of the College of Organists were:

 G.B. Arnold, New College, Oxford
 W.H. Adams, St Martin-in-the-Fields
 T.G. Baines, organist at St Margaret's, Westminster
 J. Blockley, St Mark's Regents Park
 A.S. Cooper
 W.B. Gilbert, Mus. B. Oxon, All Saints Church, Maidstone
 A.W. Hammond, Hon. Treasurer and proprietor and editor of the Musical Standard
 Edward Herbert, Mus. B., Oxon, Sherborne Abbey
 James Higgs
 Edward John Hopkins 
 Charles Kelly, All Souls Church, Langham Place
 F. Kingsbury
 Richard Limpus, Honorary secretary
 William Henry Longhurst
 E. M. Lott, St Peter's, Notting Hill
 Dr. Marshall, St John's Church, Kidderminster
 Edwin George Monk
 Ebenezer Prout
 W. Spark, Leeds Town Hall
 Charles Steggall
 Charles Edward Stephens
 Joseph Surman, Exeter Hall
 W.J. Westbrook, St Bartholomew's, Sydenham

Edmund Hart Turpin, was made a fellow of the Royal College of Organist without examination in 1869, and became a member shortly afterwards. From 1875 he succeeded Richard Limpus as honorary secretary of the Royal College of Organists.

Learning and outreach

Through the RCO Academy programme the college provides training and learning support for organists and choral directors, from students and amateur musicians to professionals.

The college's learning services includes: a programme of classes, workshops and courses throughout the UK and abroad; online support through the iRCO learning hub; and teaching via RCO-accredited teachers and institutions.

Exams

The college offers five diplomas.  The Diploma of Colleague (CRCO) (formerly the Certificate, CertRCO) is a qualification for the intermediate organist and provides a foundation for developing organists and choral directors. The Associateship Diploma (ARCO) demonstrates high achievement in organ playing and supporting theoretical work. The Fellowship diploma (FRCO) offers a progression for those who already hold the ARCO and represents a premier standard in organ playing, which a cathedral organist would be expected to hold. The Choral Directing Diploma (Dip CHD) demonstrates achievement in choral conducting and related disciplines. The Licentiateship in Teaching (LTRCO) provides professional accreditation for organ teachers who already hold either the ARCO or FRCO.

In 2016 the college introduced an early-level certificate scheme called the RCO Certificate of Accredited Membership (CAM).

Library
The college's library, with in excess of 60,000 specialist holdings of organ and choral music and books, is housed at Royal Birmingham Conservatoire's Curzon Library and the Royal College of Music, London.

See also
 Anne Marsden Thomas
 American Guild of Organists

References

External links
Royal College of Organists Official Website
Royal College of Organists' 150th Anniversary Celebrations

Classical music in the United Kingdom
Music schools in England
1864 establishments in the United Kingdom
Pipe organ organizations
Royal charities of the United Kingdom
Educational institutions established in 1864